Babyfather is a BBC Two television programme which aired in the UK in 2001 and 2002. The show has been described as a "black, male, UK version of Sex and the City". It ran for two series, and was based on a novel written by Patrick Augustus. The writers of the screenplay include Avril E. Russell, Sharon Foster, and Roy Williams.

Cast
The show is set around four central characters:

 Augustus 'Gus' Pottinger – David Harewood
 Johnny Lindo – Don Gilet
 Linvall – Fraser James
 Beres – Wil Johnson

References

External links
 

BBC television dramas
2000s British drama television series
2001 British television series debuts
2002 British television series endings
Black British television shows